Charles James Hughes (born 7 September 1939) is an English former professional footballer who played as a goalkeeper. He made appearances in the English Football League with Wrexham. He also played for Rhyl.

References

1939 births
Living people
English footballers
Association football goalkeepers
Wrexham A.F.C. players
Rhyl F.C. players
English Football League players